HMS Aberford was one of 20 boats of the Ford class of patrol boats built for the Royal Navy in the 1950s.

Their names were all chosen from villages ending in -ford. This boat was named after Aberford, West Yorkshire.

The Kenya Navy was granted Aberford as a gift following independence and the formation of the Navy. She was renamed KNS (for Kenya Navy Ship) Nyati, and was the first ship in the Kenyan Navy. She was withdrawn and laid up in the late 1960s off the Southern Engineering yard in Mbaraki Creek in Mombasa and eventually beached and scrapped in 1975.

References

Ford-class seaward defence boats
Royal Navy ship names
1952 ships